"Love Etc." is a song by English synth-pop duo Pet Shop Boys from their tenth studio album, Yes (2009). It was released on 16 March 2009 as the album's lead single. The single was also made available on the US and Canadian iTunes Stores on 24 March 2009, making it the duo's first single to be released in the US, albeit as a digital download, since "Break 4 Love" in 2001.

The song was co-written by Pet Shop Boys with production team Xenomania, who also produced the track. Pet Shop Boys describe "Love Etc." as "a post-lifestyle anthem which sounds like nothing we've done before." The single became the duo's ninth number-one entry on the Hot Dance Club Songs chart; the pair thus overtook Depeche Mode to break the record for the most chart-toppers by a duo or group on the Billboard dance chart.

The music video was directed by Dutch digital artist Han Hoogerbrugge. The website Stereogum described it as a "horizontally scrolling animated video [that] is part Sonic The Hedgehog (dated video game reference!) and part Pac Man (chomping down on hearts, shamrocks, and cash money), with a lineup of Chrisses, Neils, and others shouting, flexing, unmasking, and turning into draculas."

Track listings
UK CD single
"Love Etc." – 3:32
"Gin and Jag" – 4:29

UK and German CD single – The Remixes
"Love Etc." (album version) – 3:32
"Love Etc." (Pet Shop Boys Mix) – 6:17
"Love Etc." (Gui Boratto Mix) – 8:03
"Love Etc." (Kurd Maverick Mix) – 5:55
"Love Etc." (Frankmusik Star & Garter Dub) – 3:21
"Love Etc." (Kurd Maverick Dub) – 5:54

UK and German iTunes single
"Love Etc." – 3:32
"We're All Criminals Now" – 3:55

UK and German iTunes EP
"Love Etc." (Pet Shop Boys Mix) – 6:16
"Love Etc." (Gui Boratto Mix) – 8:02
"Love Etc." (Kurd Maverick Mix) – 5:54
"Love Etc." (Frankmusik Star & Garter Dub) – 3:21

US iTunes EP
"Love Etc." – 3:32
"We're All Criminals Now" – 3:55
"Gin and Jag" – 4:28

US iTunes remix EP
"Love Etc." (Pet Shop Boys Mix) – 6:16
"Love Etc." (Gui Boratto Mix) – 8:02
"Love Etc." (Kurd Maverick Mix) – 5:54
"Love Etc." (Frankmusik Star & Garter Dub) – 3:21
"Love Etc." (Kurd Maverick Dub) – 5:53

Credits and personnel
Credits adapted from the liner notes of Yes.

 Neil Tennant – lead vocals
 Chris Lowe – keyboards, programming
 Brian Higgins – production, keyboards, programming
 Xenomania – production, backing vocals
 Jeremy Wheatley – mixing
 Tim Powell – keyboards, programming
 Fred Falke – keyboards, programming
 Matt Gray – keyboards, programming
 Owen Parker – keyboards, programming, guitars
  – keyboards, programming
 Dick Beetham – mastering

Charts

Weekly charts

Year-end charts

See also
 List of Billboard Hot Dance Club Play number ones of 2009

References

2009 singles
2009 songs
Animated music videos
Parlophone singles
Pet Shop Boys songs
Song recordings produced by Xenomania
Songs written by Brian Higgins (producer)
Songs written by Chris Lowe
Songs written by Miranda Cooper
Songs written by Neil Tennant
Songs written by Tim Powell (producer)